The High Karst Unit (or High Karst Zone) is a tectonic unit in the Balkans region of Southeastern Europe, part of the Dinaric Alps or Dinarides, that is characterized by typical high-altitude karst features. It is found in Slovenia, Croatia, Italy, Bosnia and Herzegovina, Kosovo, Serbia, Montenegro and Albania.

Geology 
The High Karst Unit of the External Dinarides is a tectonic unit established by French geologists, so-called Aubouin's group, as reviewed in a recent scientific literature. The unit consists of a highly tectonically deformed carbonate and clastic rock successions deposited between the Upper Carboniferous age of the Carboniferous period in the Mesozoic Era, and the Eocene epoch of the Paleogene period in the Cenozoic Era.

Associations 
In the north the High Karst Unit is overthrust by Southern Alpine units. In the east the Pre-Karst Unit and the Bosnian Flysch overthrust it. The High Karst Unit overthrusts the Dalmatian Zone in the west and the Budva-Cukali Zone in the southwest. In the south the unit is cut off by the Skadar-Peć Fault and borders the Western Vardar Ophiolitic Unit.

See also 
 
 Karst

References 

Geologic formations of Europe
Environment of the Balkans
Karst formations
Limestone formations
Carboniferous System of Europe
Permian System of Europe
Jurassic System of Europe
Triassic System of Europe
Cretaceous System of Europe
Paleogene Europe
Geography of Southeastern Europe
Geology of Albania
Geology of Bosnia and Herzegovina
Geology of Croatia
Karst formations of Croatia
Geologic formations of Italy
Geology of Kosovo
Geology of Montenegro
Geology of Serbia
Geology of Slovenia
Karst formations of Slovenia